Andrea Jaeger was the defending champion but did not compete that year.

Bettina Bunge won in the final 6–3, 6–3 against Eva Pfaff.

Seeds
A champion seed is indicated in bold text while text in italics indicates the round in which that seed was eliminated.

  Tracy Austin (quarterfinals)
  Pam Shriver (quarterfinals)
  Hana Mandlíková (first round)
  Wendy Turnbull (semifinals)
  Sylvia Hanika (final)
  Bettina Bunge (champion)
  Barbara Potter (first round)
  Mima Jaušovec (first round)

Draw

External links
 1983 Virginia Slims of California Draw

Silicon Valley Classic
1983 Virginia Slims World Championship Series